Emma Zia D'Arcy (born 27 June 1992) is an English actor. They are known for their roles in the BBC drama Wanderlust (2018), the Amazon Prime series Truth Seekers (2020), and the HBO fantasy series House of the Dragon (2022–), the latter of which earned them critical acclaim and a Golden Globe Award nomination.

Early life
D'Arcy was born in the North London Borough of Enfield. In year six, they played Titania in a school production of A Midsummer Night's Dream, which they credit for introducing them to acting. They studied Fine Art at the Ruskin School of Art through St Edmund Hall, Oxford, graduating in 2011. During their time at university, D'Arcy took up theatre on the side with their friends, beginning as a set designer before moving into acting and directing.

Career

Theatre
D'Arcy has appeared in several theatre productions; their earliest appearances were in Martin McDonagh’s The Pillowman at the Oxford Playhouse, Romeo and Juliet at London's Southwark Playhouse, and Clickbait at Theatre503. In 2016, D’Arcy played Tammy Frazier in Callisto: A Queer Epic, directed by Thomas Bailey, at the Arcola Theatre. They starred as Bell in the April 2017 production, A Girl in School Uniform (Walks into a Bar), at the West Yorkshire Playhouse. In August 2017, D‘Arcy appeared alongside Ben Whishaw in playwright Christopher Shinn’s Against, at the Almeida Theatre. Writing for the arts desk, Aleks Sierz praised D’Arcy's performance as well as the production’s "marvellous moments of wry humour and acute emotional insight."

In 2018, D’Arcy returned to the Arcola Theatre to portray Lucrezia in Hal Coase’s adaptation of Virginia Woolf’s Mrs. Dalloway. D’Arcy was lauded for their "striking" performance and the production was commended for it’s stylish simplicity and theatrical flair. In 2019, D’Arcy appeared in The Yard Theatre’s production of Arthur Miller's The Crucible. They were credited for being both riveting and compelling in their role as Elizabeth Proctor. The production won acclaim, with Fiona Mountford of The Evening Standard calling it the finest adaptation of The Crucible she had ever seen. D'Arcy is the Joint Artistic Director of Forward Arena Theatre Company.

Television
D'Arcy made their television debut as Naomi Richards in Nick Payne's 2018 BBC One and Netflix series Wanderlust. In 2019, they appeared as Alma Smith in the drama series Wild Bill. In 2020, they played Sonia Richter in the Amazon Prime Video action drama streaming series Hanna. They also starred as Astrid in the 2020 Amazon Prime Video series Truth Seekers, a comedy horror series starring Nick Frost.

Critical acclaim with House of the Dragon 
In December 2020, it was announced that D’Arcy had been cast as Rhaenyra Targaryen in the HBO fantasy series House of the Dragon, a Game of Thrones prequel and adaptation of George R. R. Martin's companion book Fire and Blood. D'Arcy admitted that while they’d been aware of Game of thrones, they hadn’t actually seen the House of the Dragon predecessor until after being cast in the role of Rhaenyra. They had however read Fire and Blood. The series began production in April 2021, and its ten-episode first season debuted in August 2022. In an interview with Entertainment Weekly, showrunner and executive producer Ryan Condal revealed D'Arcy’s Rhaenyra to be, in many ways, House of The Dragon’s most important character, with Director Miguel Sapochnik labeling D'Arcy “the face of the show.” The importance of the role led to D’Arcy being placed under much scrutiny, particularly after Milly Alcock’s rendition of the character in her younger years had been positively received.

D'Arcy’s take on the character however was an instant hit, garnering them widespread critical acclaim with critics including it among some of the best performances of the year. In her review for The A.V. Club, critic Jenna Scherer wrote, “It’s impossible to look away whenever D’Arcy’s expressive face is in the frame; even when the show itself drags, they electrify every scene they’re in.’’ Writing for Comic Book Resources, Philip Etemesi pointed to D’Arcy’s strong theatre background as the reason for their “expert handling of such a complex character.’’ Additionally, Marcus Jones of IndieWire praised D’Arcy’s turn as Rhaenyra proclaiming: “Though “House of the Dragon” is an ensemble series, viewers can tell just by D’Arcy’s presence that their Rhaenyra is the star of the show.’’

In November 2022, D’Arcy was Honoured by GQ magazine as one of the breakout stars of the year. They were awarded Performer of the Week by TVLine for the week of October 23, 2022, for their performance in the season one finale "The Black Queen"; TVLine later went on to name D’Arcy the year’s Biggest Acting Revelation. Out magazine’s Mey Rude stated, “D’Arcy has stepped up to the plate in a role that would make most actors stagger, and has become an instant star in doing so.’’ For their performance, D’Arcy received a nomination for the Golden Globe Award for Best Actress – Television Series Drama.

Film
In March 2020, D'Arcy appeared in the comedy-drama film Misbehaviour directed by Philippa Lowthorpe. In 2021, they portrayed Emma Hobday in the romantic drama Mothering Sunday. The film was directed by Eva Husson and explored class divides and postwar survivor’s guilt in 1924.

Personal life 
D'Arcy is non-binary and uses they/them pronouns.

Filmography

Film

Television

Music video

Theatre

Awards and nominations

Notes

References

External links
 

Living people
1992 births
20th-century English actors
21st-century English actors
Actors from London
Alumni of the Ruskin School of Art
Alumni of St Edmund Hall, Oxford
British non-binary actors
English film actors
English stage actors
English television actors
English LGBT actors
People from the London Borough of Enfield